is a Japanese superhero anime television series created and written by Shō Aikawa, directed by Seiji Mizushima, produced by Bones, and featuring character designs by Yoshiyuki Ito. It began airing in Japan in October 2015. A second season debuted on April 3, 2016.

Plot
In the year Apotheosis 41 (AD 1962), Earth is currently home to superhumans and paranormal phenomena of all kinds, from aliens and magical girls to ghosts and transforming robots. However, official knowledge of these beings is officially kept under wraps by the governments of the world. The Japanese government has quietly set up the "Super Population Research Laboratory",  the "Superhuman Bureau", to keep track of all superhuman beings in the country and eliminate them if they pose a threat to humanity. In the present, Bureau member Jiro Hitoyoshi finds himself recruiting new superhumans for the Bureau in the course of his job. However, five years later in Apotheosis 46, Jiro turns into a vigilante on the run from the Bureau while the rest of its members deal with the consequences of their earlier actions.

Characters

Superhuman Bureau

 (Japanese), Greg Ayres (English)
The male protagonist of the series, the point-man of the Superhuman Bureau and the only real human of the group. He is an "ally of justice" and seeks to protect all superhumans, both heroes and villains. In episode 4, it is revealed that he has a superhuman ability himself: the ability to produce and control large crimson flames from his left arm. These flames tend to burn anything they come in contact with, though he tends to lose control over it. Jirō's left arm has white straps with red markings and three gears inside his arm, which can be unlocked to activate his power. Once the third gear is unlocked, he loses control of himself and goes berserk. Emi is the only one who can close up and seal the gears back into his arm, reverting him back to normal. He drives a silver-plated supercar that can transform into a quadrupedal mech named "Equus." Jirō is later revealed to be a Kaiju from another dimension, which is where his powers originate.

,
 (Japanese), Jād Saxton (English)
A magical girl with an interest in manga, especially for its fictional portrayals of magical girls. Ullr mentions that Kikko is actually a demon from another dimension who gains power by indirectly forming a sort of contract with those she saves. As a demon, she is a candidate to become the queen of the demon world and was sent to the human world in search of a husband. When she transforms into her magical girl form, her hair turns lavender and she wears an extravagant dress. Kikko uses a staff that is topped with a star ornament, although she can also use this staff while untransformed. In her devil realm outfit, Kikko is wearing full-on black with much less coverage. She wears a cape, unusual helmet that borders her face and uses a weapon called "Comet Tail" that seems to come out of Ullr's star. While in her devil form, her personality is ruthless and she is much more powerful. Kikko develops feeling for Jirō and is a rival to Emi for his affection.

 (Japanese), Anastasia Muñoz (English)
A half-human half-yōkai who has lived with Jirō since they were young and whose powers include controlling birds and shape-shifting. She is very protective of Jirō and has had feelings for him ever since they were young and once claimed to be his fiancée. She hates when Kikko gets close to him as she sees her as a rival for his affection. Emi wears a white and blue outlined coat. Underneath the coat, she wears a dark gray long-sleeved shirt with the sleeves coming up and cutting off at her knuckles. This is coupled with a cranberry pencil mini skirt and very high dark gray boots with heels and golden buttons. She is also the only one who can restore the locks holding Jirō's flames at bay without getting killed. Emi is also able to control spirit-like foxes that are able to follow and track people.

 (Japanese), Alison Viktorin (English)
A ghost who can change shape at will and phase through inorganic objects. He loves playing childish pranks on people, and is stuck forever with a child's body and personality. Jirō recommends him in joining the Superhuman Bureau.

 (Japanese), Christopher Bevins (English)
Usually called "Mr. Jaguar", Yoshimura is a man from the 25th century who was sent by the Time Patrol to destroy the Advocates of Free History. His powers include transformation into a jaguar and stopping time using his pocket watch. He is also a genius physicist and created Equus. He decided that he could make the future better if he changed the past, thus leaving the Time Patrol and forming IQ.

 (Japanese); Mark Stoddard (English)

 (Japanese), Ian Sinclair (English)
A formerly-human detective who was killed during a case, his personality was implanted in the body of an android by an unnamed scientist. Raito is the only detective in the Tokyo Metropolitan Police who works on superhuman cases, though he finds himself stymied by the Superhuman Bureau as they cover up evidence.

 (Japanese), Jason Douglas (English)
A professor who serves as the technical expert of the Superhuman Bureau. Though his knowledge is mainly in physics and robotics, he also has studied enough anthropology to deal with organic superhumans.

 (Japanese), David Wald (English)
Kikko's Daruma-like assistant.

 (Japanese), Orion Pitts (English)
A chilled and clever man.

Superhumans

 (Japanese); Anthony Bowling (English)
A police officer named Akira fuses with a crash-landed alien, Grosse Augen. He used the alien's power to fight giant monsters and outer space threats, while sharing his own life to ensure Augen's safety. However, when the Superhuman Bureau sees him as a threat due to his size, Hitoyoshi was sent to kill him but in reality he ordered Akira to give his life to Augen for the alien to leave this planet while taking an unconscious S Planeterian as a substitute, allowing him to fight as a superhero once again. In Apotheosis 46, he assisted Hitoyoshi after he was on the run from the Superhuman Bureau.

 (Japanese); Shawn Gann (English)
An alien invader and Grosse Augen's nemesis. He was defeated by Augen with the help of Equus. He was shrunken and rendered unconscious, allowing Akira to use his body while Augen return to his home planet. His body has blue markings, which changed to red when being possessed by Akira.

A race of prehistoric bugs from the ancient years, they maintained their existence in the modern era and signed a contract with humanity to reside the forest. But after corrupted politicians ordered the deforestation of their homes, they sought vengeance until Fuurouta threw a canister of ancient virus which successfully halted their attack but endangered their race.

 (Japanese); Monica Rial (English)
The queen of the Tartarus Bugmen, one day she was caught by a bug salesman and offered for sale at  Yen until Fuurouta rescued her. She is able to take a human form of a young girl, which later changed into an adult woman seven years later. She sparked an interest on Fuurouta and befriended him but after he killed the majority of the Bugmen, she tried to take revenge seven years later in Apotheosis 48, though Hiyotoshi's interference halted her assaults. Despite having ceased her vengeance, she is incapable of befriending Fuurouta due to his age and appearance.

Development
Bones first unveiled the project on 1 July 2015. The series is directed by Seiji Mizushima and written by Shō Aikawa. Yoshiyuki Ito provides character designs and animation direction; Noizi Ito, Hekiru Hikawa, and Ryō Hirao are in charge of character creation and concept design; and Kanetake Ebikawa, Takayuki Yanase, Toshiaki Ihara, and Hideyuki Matsumoto are in charge of SF concept design. Ken Ohtsuka is the series mechanical animation director, and Hiroki Matsumoto provides the series art design. Masafumi Mima is the series' sound director. Anime Consortium Japan co-produced the series.

Media

Manga
The manga has been licensed by Seven Seas Entertainment.

Anime
The anime began airing on 4 October 2015, to run for two cours (half a year), airing on Tokyo MX, Sun TV, KBS Kyoto, and BS11. The series is streamed worldwide by Daisuki, and in North America by Funimation. The opening theme song, is performed by ZAQ, and the closing theme song is performed by Yohske Yamamoto.

The second season premiered in April 2016.

Episode list

Season 1

Season 2

Manga
A manga adaptation with art by Nylon began serialization in the September 2015 issue of Kadokawa Shoten's Young Ace magazine.

Reception

Nick Creamer of Anime News Network praised the show for its "rousing exploration of the nature of justice in the context of post-war Japan", but criticised the narrative for being confusing at times.

References

External links

  
  
  at Young Ace 
 

2015 anime television series debuts
2016 anime television series debuts
Anime with original screenplays
Bones (studio)
Funimation
Films with screenplays by Gen Urobuchi
Films with screenplays by Shō Aikawa
Kadokawa Shoten manga
Seinen manga
Seven Seas Entertainment titles
Superheroes in anime and manga